The 2023 Bahrain Ministry of Interior Tennis Challenger was a professional tennis tournament played on hard courts. It was the second edition of the tournament which was part of the 2023 ATP Challenger Tour. It took place in Manama, Bahrain between 13 and 19 February 2023.

Singles main-draw entrants

Seeds

 1 Rankings are as of 6 February 2023.

Other entrants
The following players received wildcards into the singles main draw:
  Bekkhan Atlangeriev
  Yusuf Qaed
  Abedallah Shelbayh

The following player received entry into the singles main draw as a special exempt:
  Stefano Travaglia

The following player received entry into the singles main draw as an alternate:
  Oriol Roca Batalla

The following players received entry from the qualifying draw:
  Andrea Arnaboldi
  Aleksandr Braynin
  Viktor Durasovic
  Yankı Erel
  Vitaliy Sachko
  Mohamed Safwat

The following players received entry as lucky losers:
  Salvatore Caruso
  Andrey Chepelev
  Colin Sinclair

Champions

Singles

  Thanasi Kokkinakis def.  Abedallah Shelbayh 6–1, 6–4.

Doubles

  Patrik Niklas-Salminen /  Bart Stevens def.  Ruben Gonzales /  Fernando Romboli 6–3, 6–4.

References

2023 ATP Challenger Tour
2023 in Bahraini sport
February 2023 sports events in Asia